Wong Kim Poh (12 February 1934 – 29 October 2013) was a Singaporean basketball player. He competed in the men's tournament at the 1956 Summer Olympics.

References

External links
 

1934 births
2013 deaths
People from Kluang
Malaysian emigrants to Singapore
Singaporean men's basketball players
Olympic basketball players of Singapore
Basketball players at the 1956 Summer Olympics
Singaporean sportspeople of Chinese descent